Macrobathra asemanta is a moth in the family Cosmopterigidae. It was described by Oswald Bertram Lower in 1894. It was initially found in Australia, where its presence was confirmed in Tasmania.

References

Macrobathra
Moths described in 1894